Tehan is a surname. Notable people with the surname include:
 Dan Tehan (born 1968), politician
 Joseph Tehan, poker player
 Marie Tehan (1940–2004), politician
 Robert Emmet Tehan (1905–1975), jurist
 Tom Tehan (1916–1996), politician
 Tehan Tuomela (2005-, Keisari)
tehan kikkeli (2005-, kuningas ollirr)